Niveria harriettae is a species of small sea snail, a marine gastropod mollusc in the family Triviidae, the false cowries or trivias.

This species was described by Dirk Fehse and Jozef Grego in 2010, and is known from the Gulf of Mexico and the Caribbean Sea.

References

Triviidae
Gastropods described in 2010